Arnold Vitarbo (January 31, 1936 – September 14, 2022) was an American sports shooter. He competed in the 50 metre pistol event at the 1968 Summer Olympics.

References

1936 births
2022 deaths
American male sport shooters
Olympic shooters of the United States
Shooters at the 1968 Summer Olympics
Sportspeople from New York City
Pan American Games medalists in shooting
Pan American Games gold medalists for the United States
Shooters at the 1967 Pan American Games
20th-century American people
21st-century American people